"A Selena Tribute" is a tribute song performed by American singer and actress Jennifer Lopez. The track was performed live during the 2015 Billboard Latin Music Awards as a homage for American singer Selena, backed by her former band Los Dinos. It was released the following day on 3 May 2015 as a digital download. The single consists of a medley of six Selena's songs: "Como la Flor", "Bidi Bidi Bom Bom", "Amor Prohibido", "I Could Fall in Love" and "No Me Queda Mas".

Charts

References

External links

2015 singles
Jennifer Lopez songs
Spanish-language songs
2015 songs
Songs written by A. B. Quintanilla
Epic Records singles
Songs written by Ricky Vela
Songs written by Pete Astudillo
Songs written by Selena
Songs written by Keith Thomas (record producer)
Live singles